This is a listing of the horses that finished in either first, second, or third place and the number of starters in the Breeders' Cup Filly & Mare Turf, a grade one race run on grass on Friday of the Breeders' Cup World Thoroughbred Championships.

References 
 Breeders' Cup official website

Filly and Mare Turf
Lists of horse racing results